The Lung Center of the Philippines (LCP) is a government tertiary hospital specializing in the cure and prevention of lung and other chest diseases, located on Central, Quezon City, Philippines. The center receives budgetary support for its operations from the national government. It was constructed on public land donated by the National Housing Authority.

The Lung Center has a hospital bed capacity of 210.

History
The LCP was established on January 16, 1981, by President Ferdinand Marcos under Presidential Decree No. 1823 as a non-profit non-stock corporation. The building is identified with what is referred to as the Marcoses' "edifice complex," defined by architect Gerard Lico as "an obsession and compulsion to build edifices as a hallmark of greatness."

The Lung Center was placed under the administration of the Ministry of Health (now Department of Health) by President Corazon Aquino on July 29, 1986, under Executive Order No. 34. The purpose of its creation was to provide health care that specifically targets lung and pulmonary disease.

A fire on May 16, 1998, destroyed much of the LCP's build and equipment. The fire, which started on 2:20 a.m., claimed 11 lives with nine more missing. Calixto Zaldivar, the director of the Lung Center of the Philippines, was indicted on October 19, 1999, for criminal negligence. He was accused of ignoring advice from fire inspectors to install safety equipment at the Lung Center. 

The Lung Center of the Philippines was reopened on March 1, 1999, and a new LCP building partly funded by its fire insurance began construction.

The Lung Center runs one of three monitoring stations run under an air quality monitoring project in Metro Manila.

References

External links
 Official Website of the Lung Center of the Philippines

Hospitals in Quezon City
Hospitals established in 1981
Government-owned and controlled corporations of the Philippines
Buildings and structures in Quezon City
Lung disease organizations
Establishments by Philippine presidential decree